Higashi-Matsue Station (東松江駅) is the name of two train stations in Japan:

 Higashi-Matsue Station (Shimane)
 Higashi-Matsue Station (Wakayama)